The Federal Correctional Institution, Morgantown (FCI Morgantown) is a minimum-security United States federal prison for male inmates in West Virginia. It is operated by the Federal Bureau of Prisons, a division of the United States Department of Justice. The facility has been nicknamed 'Club Fed' because of its amenities which include a large college-like campus, a movie theater, a bocce ball court and a basketball court as well as housing many white collar, nonviolent offenders.

FCI Morgantown is located in the city of Morgantown in northern West Virginia and approximately 160 miles northeast of Charleston, the state capital.

History
Senator Bobby Kennedy Ted Kennedy dedicated the Robert F. Kennedy Youth Center in December 1968. The facility was designed to be the first of its kind to test a new method of detention employing an experimental "unit management" model that promoted a humane approach, grouping inmates into units of 50 to 200 overseen by multidisciplinary teams and specialized staff to tend to inmate needs including religious services, training, and counseling and rehabilitation. Less than a decade after opening, the facility transitioned from housing juvenile offenders to adult, male inmates. The name of the facility was later changed to 'Federal Correctional Institution, Morgantown Kennedy Center'

Notable incidents
In August 2008, 50-year-old Randall Michael pleaded guilty to committing mail fraud while he was an inmate at FCI Morgantown. Michael masterminded a scheme to obtain money by falsely representing himself to potential investors as a wealthy executive who was attempting to obtain a grant requiring a refundable $50,000 bond with which he would purchase approximately 13 acres for $3.9 million for coal exploration. One individual subsequently mailed Michael a check for $26,250 addressed to the false bonding company, which Michael cashed and distributed to members of his own family. Michael was sentenced to an additional 24 months in prison on July 9, 2009.

Notable inmates

Current

Former

See also
List of U.S. federal prisons
Federal Bureau of Prisons
Incarceration in the United States

References 

Buildings and structures in Monongalia County, West Virginia
Prisons in West Virginia
Federal Correctional Institutions in the United States